Fridericia chica, the cricket-vine, puca panga, chica, carayurú (Spanish), carajuru or crajiru (Portuguese), is a medicinal plant in the family Bignoniaceae, also used for cosmetics. An orange-red dye called chica, crajiru or carayurú is obtained from boiling the leaves. It is used by some native South American peoples to stain the skin.

References

External links

Bignoniaceae
Plant dyes
Taxa named by Aimé Bonpland
Taxa named by Alexander von Humboldt
Plants described in 1807
Natural dyes